OmniPage is an optical character recognition (OCR) application available from Kofax Incorporated.

OmniPage was one of the first OCR programs to run on personal computers.
It was developed in the late 1980s and sold by Caere Corporation, a company headed by Robert Noyce. The original developers were Philip Bernzott, John Dilworth, David George, Bryan Higgins, and Jeremy Knight.
Caere was acquired by ScanSoft in 2000.
ScanSoft acquired Nuance Communications in 2005, and took over its name. By 2019 OmniPage had been sold to Kofax Inc.

OmniPage supports more than 120 different languages.

References

External links
 
 
 

Nuance software
Optical character recognition software